James Annesley may refer to:

James Annesley, 2nd Earl of Anglesey (1645–1690)
James Annesley, 3rd Earl of Anglesey (1670–1702)
James Annesley (1715–1760)

See also
Annesley (disambiguation)